Son Little is the first studio album by American soul musician Son Little. It was released on Anti- on October 16, 2015. It is a follow up to his 2014 EP, Things I Forgot.

Reception
At Metacritic, which assigns a weighted average score out of 100 to reviews from mainstream critics, the album received an average score of 75% based on 5 reviews, indicating "generally favorable reviews".

Mark Deming of AllMusic gave the album 4 stars out of 5, saying: "Sometimes troubling, frequently joyous, and always articulate and thoroughly individual, Son Little's cross-genre shape-shifting reveals more compelling nuances with each listen, and this is one of the most interesting and rewarding debuts of 2015."

American Songwriter placed "Go Blue Blood Red" at number 46 on its list of the "Top 50 Songs of 2015".

Track listing

References

External links
 

2015 debut albums
Son Little albums
Anti- (record label) albums